Weiss Ferdl (28 June 1883 – 19 June 1949, real name: Ferdinand Weisheitinger) was a German actor, humorous folksinger, and author. He appeared in 19 films between 1928 and 1941 and performed regularly at the Platzl, a well-known Munich theater.

His famous song "Ein Wagen von der Linie Acht" ("A Carriage from Line 8") is still played to this day. It is a mocking song about Munich people and the trams in Munich. The Weiß-Ferdl-Mittelschule, a secondary school in Altötting, has a retired blue Munich Tram carriage in the southeast corner of the schoolyard.

Selected filmography
 Behind Monastery Walls (1928)
 Left of the Isar, Right of the Spree (1929)
 The Immortal Vagabond (1930)
 The Song of the Nations (1931)
 The Champion Shot (1932)
 The Master Detective (1933)
 The Two Seals (1934)
 All Because of the Dog (1935)
 Orders Are Orders (1936)
 Gordian the Tyrant (1937)
 Wunschkonzert (1940)

Selected discography
 CD Weiß Ferdl, I woaß net wia ma is, Aufnahmen 1919–1946, Ed. Christian Springer, Trikont 2001

Selected bibliography
 Ich bin kein Intellektueller. Ein heiteres Buch. Hugendubel, München 1941.
 Bayerische Schmankerl. Hrsg.: Bertl Weiss. dtv, München 1982, .

References

Further reading
 Sabine Sünwoldt (Bearb.): Weiß Ferdl. Eine weiß-blaue Karriere. Hugendubel, München 1983, .
 Robert Eben Sackett: Popular entertainment, class, and politics in Munich, 1900-1923. Study of Munich popular theatre, focusing on Karl Valentin and Weiß Ferdl. Harvard University Press, Cambridge, Massachusetts, USA, 1982,  (englisch).
 Rolf Giesen: Hitler’s Third Reich of the Movies. BearManor Media ISBN 978-1-62933-629-9

External links

1883 births
1949 deaths
German male film actors
20th-century German male actors
People from Altötting